Fildha Elishandi (born March 12, 1991) is an actress from Indonesia. She began her career in the world of film through films Putih Abu-Abu dan Sepatu Kets.

Filmography 
 Putih Abu-Abu dan Sepatu Kets (2009)

References

External links 
 Profil 
 Foto Profile Artis Filda Elishandi

1991 births
Living people
Indonesian actresses
People from Malang